HMS Greyhound was a modified Royal Navy  sixth-rate frigate. She was first commissioned in October 1775 under Captain Archibald Dickson.

Service
On 15 May 1778 captured an American sloop off Cape Henry. On 16 May captured American schooner Dolphin off Cape Charles. On 18 May captured American schooner Herbert. On 19 May captured sloop Fame off Cape Charles.

Notes

References

 
 
 

1773 ships
Sixth-rate frigates of the Royal Navy
Ships built on the Beaulieu River
Maritime incidents in 1781